Michael Molloy (born 22 December 1940) is a British author and former newspaper editor and cartoonist.

Biography
Born in Hertfordshire, Molloy studied at Ealing Junior School and the Ealing School of Art before working at the Sunday Pictorial followed by the Daily Sketch, where he began drawing cartoons. In 1962, he joined the Daily Mirror, where he rose through the ranks until in 1975 he became editor.

In 1985, Robert Maxwell appointed Molloy Editor-in-Chief of the Daily Mirror, Sunday Mirror and The People, where he introduced colour printing. From 1986 to 1988, he additionally edited the Sunday Mirror.

From 1985 to 1995, Molloy wrote seven crime fiction books set in England, four featuring Sarah Keane and three featuring Lewis Home.

In 1990, Molloy left the Mirror Group, and in 1996 he bought Punch on behalf of Mohammed Al Fayed. He became its deputy editor, but left after six issues.

After retiring from the newspaper industry, he began writing children's fantasy novels.

In 2003, he was shortlisted for the Stockton Children's Book of the Year, while in 2007, he was shortlisted for the Hampshire Book Award.

Molloy married Sandy Foley in 1964 and they have three daughters, Jane (an interiors stylist), Kate (a journalist) and Alexandra (a writer).

Published books
The Century
The Witch Trade
The Wild West Witches
The Time Witches
The House on Falling Star Hill
Peter Raven under Fire
The Black Dwarf 
Cat's Paw 
Dogsbody 
Harlot of Jericho
Home Before Dark 
The Kid from Riga
Sweet Sixteen
Experiencing the World's Religions

References

1940 births
Living people
English children's writers
English fantasy writers
English newspaper editors
English male journalists
21st-century English novelists
People from Hertfordshire
Daily Mirror people
English male short story writers
English short story writers
English male novelists
21st-century British short story writers
21st-century English male writers